The 2002 season is the 51st year in Guangzhou Football Club's existence, their 37th season in the Chinese football league and the 11th season in the professional football league.

2002
Guangzhou Apollo